New Canton is an unincorporated community located along the border of Robbinsville Township in Mercer County and Upper Freehold Township in Monmouth County, New Jersey, United States. The area was once known as Cabbagetown and has been settled since the 18th century. The settlement is located at the intersection of Old York Road (County Route 539) and New Canton-Stone Tavern Road (CR 524) just north of Interstate 195's interchange 8. The Upper Freehold side of the area contains farmland and new housing developments while the Robbinsville side features new commercial warehouse buildings including an Amazon.com Fulfillment Center opened in July 2014.

References

Robbinsville Township, New Jersey
Upper Freehold Township, New Jersey
Unincorporated communities in Mercer County, New Jersey
Unincorporated communities in Monmouth County, New Jersey
Unincorporated communities in New Jersey